Kimberly Raye is an American author who writes mostly Romance and Paranormal fiction. She is the creator of the Dead End Dating series as well as authored a variety of Harlequin Romance titles. She currently resides in Texas with her husband and children. She has also written under the alias, Kimberly Randell.

Bibliography

Novels 
Til We Meet Again (1995)
Only in My Dreams (1997)
Gettin' Lucky (1998)
Midnight Kisses (2000)
The Pleasure Principle (2001)
A Stranger's Kiss (2001)
Fast Track (2008)
Slippery When Wet (2008)

Inspiration, Texas 

 Breathless (1999)
 Restless (2000)
 Shameless (2000)

Farrel Sisters 

 Kiss Me Once, Kiss Me Twice (2004)
 Sometimes Naughty, Sometimes Nice (2004)
 Sweet as Sugar, Hot as Spice (2005)

Sex Solution 

 The Sex Solution (2004)
 The Fantasy Factor (2004)

McGraw Triplets 

 Texas Fever (2005)
 Texas Fire (2005)

Dead End Dating series
Dead End Dating, 2006
Dead and Dateless, 2007
Your Coffin or Mine?, 2007
Just One Bite, 2008
Sucker for Love, 2009
Here Comes the Vampire, 2013

Love at First Bite

Jess Damon 

 The Devil's in the Details (2013)

Texas Outlaws 

 Jesse (2013)
 Billy (2014)
 Cole (2014)

Tombstone, Texas 

 The Quick and the Undead (2014)

Rebel Moonshine 

 Texas Thunder (2015)
 Red-Hot Texas Nights (2016)
 Tempting Texas (2016)

Love Spell series 
A Stranger's Spell, 2001
A Stranger's Desire, 2003
Faithless Stranger, 2008

Series Contributed To

 Dreamscapes : Whispers of Love
 Now and Forever (1996) Book 27 of 27
 Angel's Touch
 Faithless Angel (1998) Book 11 of 12
 Legendary Lovers
 Something Wild (1998) Book 6 of 9
 Haunting Hearts
 In the Midnight Hour (1999) Book 7 of 12 writing as Kimberly Randell
 Wink & a Kiss
 Midnight Fantasies (2000) Book 8 of 9
 Trueblood Dynasty
 Dylan's Destiny (2002) Book 21 of 22
 24 Hours: Island Fling
 Tall, Tanned and Texan (2006) Book 1 of 3

Anthologies and collections

References

External links
Kimberly Raye at Fantastic Fiction

American romantic fiction novelists
Living people
American women novelists
Women science fiction and fantasy writers
Women romantic fiction writers
American fantasy writers
Year of birth missing (living people)
21st-century American women